The following is a summary of Down county football team's 2017 season.

Kits

Competitions

Dr McKenna Cup
Down started 2017 with a win against Queen's University, their first win since beating St Marys in the 2016 McKenna Cup competition. Down followed it up with a win against Derry at Páirc Esler, their first back to back win in nearly two years and first inter-county win since beat Laois in the National Football League on 4 April 2015. Down's McKenna Cup campaign ended with a defeat away to Armagh which sent Derry into the semi-finals on points difference.

Fixtures

Table

National Football League Division 2

Down played in Division Two of the National Football League in 2017 following relegation from Division One in 2016. Down had a dismal start to their campaign suffering a defeat at home to Fermanagh followed by an away defeat to Clare. Reports began to circulate that Eamon Burns was facing a mass walk out from players in the squad, this was later denied by Burns and Down went on to win their next two games.

The two wins in a row proofed to be crucial as Down went on to lose another two games leaving their Division Two status hanging in the balance. Down finished their Division Two campaign with a surprise draw away to Cork, which resulted in them retaining their place in Division Two for 2018.

Fixtures

Table

 Clare, Down and Derry finished on five league points and are ranked by score difference

Results

Ulster Senior Football Championship

The draw for the 2017 Ulster Senior Football Championship took place on 14 October 2016 with Down being drawn at home to Armagh. This was Down's first home draw in the Ulster Championship in 12 years since they faced Tyrone at home in the 2005 Ulster Championship.

Down edged out Armagh in a close, physical encounter at Páirc Esler sending them into the 2017 Ulster Championship semi-finals to face Monaghan at the Athletic Grounds in Armagh on 24 June 2017. Down produced a memorable display in a close semi-final as they pulled off arguably the shock of the 2017 Ulster Championship by beating Monaghan and earning themselves a place in the 2017 Ulster final against Tyrone on 16 July in Clones.

Down suffered a heavy defeat in the Ulster final, meaning they entered the All-Ireland series in round 4.

Fixtures

Bracket

Results

All-Ireland Senior Football Championship

Down entered the All Ireland in Round 4 of the qualifiers following their defeat to Tyrone in the Ulster final. Down were matched once again with Monaghan however in this encounter Down fell short and ended their championship season in Round 4.

Fixtures

Results

References

Down
Gaelic
Down county football team seasons